Stacy May-Johnson (born Stacy Margarita May; May 15, 1984) is an American, former collegiate, three-time professional All-Star softball player and current head coach at Fresno State. She played college softball for Iowa, being named a three-time all-conference third basemen and shortstop. May-Johnson was selected twelfth overall in the National Pro Fastpitch, eventually playing for the Chicago Bandits. She was named the inaugural Rookie of the Year in 2006 and a two-time Player of the Year in 2008 and 2010 for the league. She also helped the Bandits to win two championships and ranks in the top-10 in career hits (267) and home runs (38).

Career

College
At the University of Iowa, May-Johnson played on the Iowa Hawkeyes softball team from 2003 to 2006 at third base and shortstop. May-Johnson graduated from Iowa in May 2007 as a double major with a B.S. in physics and B.B.A. in accounting. In 2009, May-Johnson completed an M.S. in physics at the University of Louisville.

Professional
She received the MVP 2008 Professional Women's Softball League. May was drafted by the Chicago Bandits of the National Pro Fastpitch as the fourth pick in the second round. She earned the 2006 Nokona Rookie of the Year award and was also named to the all-National Pro fastpitch team.

She played for the Chicago Bandits from 2006 to 2010 and 2017 to 2018 and for the USA Softball National Team from 2011 to 2012. She was named 2011 USA Softball Female Athlete of the Year for "leading the team to gold medals at the World Cup of Softball VII in Oklahoma City and the 2011 Pan American Games in Guadalajara, Mexico". Her position as an assistant coach for the University of Louisville softball team was announced on July 14, 2014.

Coaching career
In 2007, May-Johnson was an undergraduate assistant coach at Iowa. From 2008 to 2010, May-Johnson was a volunteer assistant softball coach at Louisville while a graduate student there. May-Johnson then came back to Iowa as an assistant coach from 2011 to 2014 before returning to Louisville as an assistant coach from 2015 to 2016.

May-Johnson was an assistant coach at Purdue in 2017 and at Eastern Kentucky in 2018 and 2019.

On December 30, 2019, May-Johnson was named the head coach at Utah Valley.

On July 6, 2021, May-Johnson was named the head coach at Fresno State.

International career
May-Johnson represented the United States women's national softball team at the 2011 Pan American Games and won a gold medal.

Personal life
She is married to Nate Johnson and has two children.

Statistics

References

External links
 

1984 births
Living people
Softball players from Nevada
American softball players
American softball coaches
Iowa Hawkeyes softball coaches
Iowa Hawkeyes softball players
Louisville Cardinals softball coaches
Softball players at the 2011 Pan American Games
Pan American Games gold medalists for the United States
Pan American Games medalists in softball
Chicago Bandits players
University of Louisville alumni
Purdue Boilermakers softball coaches
Medalists at the 2011 Pan American Games